Chamkani, Tsamkani, or Samkani may refer to:

Tsamkani District, a district of Paktia Province, Afghanistan
Tsamkani, main town of Tsamkani District
Chamkani, Peshawar, a neighborhood of Peshawar District, Khyber Pakhtunkhwa, Pakistan
Chamkani (Pashtun tribe), a Pashtun tribe based in Tsamkani District, Paktia Province (Afghanistan) and Kurram and Peshawar Districts (Pakistan)